Top of the Pops (also known by its abbreviation TOTP) is a British music chart television programme. Until 2006, it was shown each week on the BBC and is now licensed for national versions around the world. The following is a list of presenters who have hosted the BBC show, including the many guest presenters over the years.

1960s–1970s
Upon its inception in 1964, Top of the Pops was presented by a team of disc jockeys in rotation: Alan Freeman, David Jacobs, Pete Murray and Jimmy Savile, who presented the very first episode from Dickenson Road Studios in Manchester on 1 January 1964 and would continue as the longest-serving presenter until hosting his final show on 30 August 1984. Samantha Juste appeared as the disc girl for several episodes until 1967. Jacobs was replaced by Simon Dee in 1966.

Jimmy Savile (1964–1984, plus 31 December 1988, 19 October 2001, 19 September 2003 and 30 July 2006)
Alan Freeman (1964–1969, plus 9 July 1981 and 31 December 1988)
Pete Murray (1964–1969, plus 9 July 1981 and 31 December 1988)
David Jacobs (1964–1966, plus 5 May 1983 and 31 December 1988)
Samantha Juste (1965–1967)
Simon Dee (1966–1969)

The start of BBC Radio 1 in 1967 brought a new influx of DJs to the presenting roster, sometimes co-presenters, although most only stayed with TOTP for a short while. Of these only Ed Stewart and John Peel would become long-term regulars, though there would be a gap before either would return as such. By 1970, only Savile and Blackburn remained of the 1960s regulars and between them they would host all the editions from January 1970 until their duopoly was broken by Ed Stewart's return in March 1971.

Tony Blackburn (1967–1979 and 1981–1983, plus 31 December 1988, 4 April 2003 and 30 July 2006)

Emperor Rosko (1967, 1974–1975)
Stuart Henry (1967–1969)
Dave Cash (1968)
Kenny Everett (1967 and 1973, plus 31 December 1988)
John Peel co-hosted a single edition in 1968, but returned more prominently in the 1980s (see below).
Ed Stewart (1968, 1971–1977)
David Symonds (1968)
14 December 1967 – Mike Lennox co-presented with Alan Freeman
14 March 1968 – Tom Edwards co-presented with Jimmy Savile
11 April 1968 – Lulu co-presented with Jimmy Savile
2 May 1968 – Alan Price co-presented with Alan Freeman
23 May 1968 – Micky Dolenz of The Monkees co-presented with Jimmy Savile
6 June 1968 – Davy Jones of The Monkees co-presented with Jimmy Savile

1970s–1980s
Jimmy Savile (1964–1984, plus 31 December 1988, 19 October 2001, 19 September 2003 and 30 July 2006)
Tony Blackburn (1967–1979, 1981–1983, plus 31 December 1988, 4 April 2003 and 30 July 2006)
Ed Stewart (1968,1971–1977)
Noel Edmonds (1972–1978, plus 5 May 1983)
Kenny Everett (1973, plus 31 December 1988)
Greg Edwards (1974)
Dave Lee Travis (1973–1984, plus 30 July 2006)
Emperor Rosko (1974–1975)
David Hamilton (1975–1977, plus 31 December 1988)
Paul Burnett (1975, 1977–1979, plus 25 December 1981 and 30 September 1982)
David "Kid" Jensen (1977–1984, plus 31 December 1988)
Peter Powell (1977–1988)
Mike Read (1978–1989, plus 30 July 2006)
Simon Bates (1979–1988)
15 December 1977 – Elton John was guest presenter
11 October 1979 – Andy Peebles presented though did not become a regular host until 1981 (see 1980s–1991 below)

1980s–1991
The close association with Radio 1 continued into the 1980s, with all TOTP presenters drawn from the ranks of DJs at the station. The list below represents the main TOTP presenters during this period with many other Radio 1 DJs, for example Liz Kershaw, Adrian Juste and Adrian John also appearing on special programmes such as Christmas broadcasts and milestones for TOTP or Radio 1. For this reason, the 30 September 1982 show celebrating Radio 1's fifteenth birthday affords Annie Nightingale, in her one and only appearance and as one of nineteen presenters that day, the honour of being the first female presenter of Top of the Pops, beating Janice Long – who would go on to present TOTP regularly for nearly six years – by three months.

By the end of the decade, the bond with Radio 1 seemed unbreakable with the show being simulcast on the station from 1988 and even traffic reporters like Sybil Ruscoe trying their hand at presenting TOTP. Presenters were also brought in from children's television, including Children's BBC presenters Andy Crane and Simon Parkin, Blue Peters Caron Keating, and Anthea Turner and Jenny Powell who worked together on Saturday morning show UP2U. With the exception of Turner, who presented until 1991, all appointments were short-lived proving indicative of the diffusion TOTP was about to undergo from Radio 1 in the 1990s.  
 
Jimmy Savile (1964–1984, plus 31 December 1988, 19 October 2001, 19 September 2003 and 30 July 2006)
Dave Lee Travis (1974–1984, plus 30 July 2006) 
David Jensen also known as "Kid Jensen" (1976–1984, plus 31 December 1988)
Peter Powell (1977–1988)
Mike Read (1978–1989, plus 30 July 2006)
Simon Bates (1979–1988)
Richard Skinner (1980–1985, plus 6 October 1988 and 19 January 1989)
Tommy Vance (1980–1984)
Steve Wright (1980–1989, plus Top of the Pops 2: 1997–2004, 2006–2007, 2008, 2009)
John Peel (1981–1987, plus 14 December 1995)
Andy Peebles (1979, 1981–1984)
Tony Blackburn (1967–1979, 1981–1983, plus 31 December 1988, 4 April 2003 and 30 July 2006)
Mike Smith (1982–1988)
Janice Long (1982–1988, plus 30 July 2006)
Gary Davies (1982–1991)
Pat Sharp (1982–1983, also a member of British vocal duo Pat and Mick together with Mick Brown, plus 30 July 2006)
Bruno Brookes (1984–1991, 1994–1995)
Dixie Peach (1985–1986)
Paul Jordan (1985–1986)
Simon Mayo (1986–1991, 1994–1996)
Nicky Campbell (1988–1991, 1994–1997)
Mark Goodier (1988–1991, 1994–1996, read the Top 20 chart rundown out-of-vision: 1997–2002)
Andy Crane (1988–1989)
Anthea Turner (1988–1991)
Sybil Ruscoe (1988–1989)
Jenny Powell (1989)
Jackie Brambles (1989–1991)

Special appearances:

9 July and 28 August 1980 – B.A. Robertson co-presented with Peter Powell
7 August 1980 – after hosting alone in 1977, Elton John returned to co-host with Peter Powell
14 August 1980 – Roger Daltrey of The Who co-presented with Tommy Vance
21 August 1980 – Cliff Richard co-presented with Steve Wright
4 September 1980 – Kevin Keegan co-presented with Dave Lee Travis
18 September 1980 – Olivia Newton-John co-presented with Simon Bates
25 September 1980 – Russ Abbot co-presented with Mike Read
30 October 1980 – Colin Berry co-presented with Peter Powell
9 July 1981 – Alan Freeman and Pete Murray both returned after over a decade's absence to present with Jimmy Savile
25 December 1981 – Paul Gambaccini co-presented alongside Adrian Juste and former presenter Paul Burnett, with regular presenters Andy Peebles, Dave Lee Travis, Simon Bates, David Jensen, Tony Blackburn, John Peel, Steve Wright, Peter Powell, Jimmy Savile, Richard Skinner and Mike Read
25 March 1982 – footballer Garth Crooks co-presented with Peter Powell
27 May 1982 – Debbie Harry of Blondie was guest presenter with John Peel.
30 September 1982 – Radio 1 celebrated its fifteenth anniversary with a special TOTP featuring DJs Paul Gambaccini, Adrian John, Adrian Juste, Jonathan King, Alexis Korner and Annie Nightingale, as well as former presenter Paul Burnett and regular presenters Dave Lee Travis, Andy Peebles, Mike Read, David Jensen, Tony Blackburn, John Peel, Jimmy Savile, Mike Smith, Steve Wright, Tommy Vance, Richard Skinner and Peter Powell
5 May 1983 – TOTP celebrated its thousandth show with the return of Noel Edmonds and David Jacobs as well as Paul Gambaccini and regular presenters Dave Lee Travis, Steve Wright, John Peel, Gary Davies, Mike Smith, Peter Powell, Simon Bates, Tommy Vance, Richard Skinner, Mike Read, Tony Blackburn, David Jensen, Andy Peebles, Janice Long, Jimmy Savile and Pat Sharp
29 December 1983 – Adrian John guest presented with Tommy Vance, Richard Skinner, Peter Powell and Gary Davies
25 December 1984 – no regular presenters featured with performers linking between songs
27 December 1984 – Lenny Henry
25 December 1985 – Jonathan King was guest presenter alongside John Peel, Janice Long, Dixie Peach, Steve Wright and Gary Davies
5 May 1988 – Adrian John co-presented with Bruno Brookes
11 August 1988 – Liz Kershaw was guest presenter with Bruno Brookes
6 October 1988 – Richard Skinner returned after three years to co-present with Simon Mayo
20 October 1988 – Caron Keating of Blue Peter co-presented with Steve Wright
17 November 1988 – Susie Mathis co-presented with Gary Davies
8 December 1988 – Caron Keating co-presented with Nicky Campbell
31 December 1988 – TOTP's 25th anniversary saw the return of Jimmy Savile, David Jacobs, Pete Murray, Alan Freeman, Kenny Everett, David Jensen, Tony Blackburn, David Hamilton and Peter Powell along with Paul Gambaccini alongside regular presenters Simon Bates, Mark Goodier and Mike Read
19 January 1989 – Richard Skinner co-presented with Bruno Brookes
23 February 1989 – Susie Mathis co-presented with Bruno Brookes
9 March 1989 – Lenny Henry co-presented with Hale and Pace and Nicky Campbell for Comic Relief. All would go on to hold the golden microphone in the mid-1990s (see below)
16 March 1989 – Rod McKenzie was guest presenter with Radio 1 breakfast show colleagues and TOTP presenters Simon Mayo and Sybil Ruscoe
15 June 1989 – Simon Parkin of the Children's BBC #Presentation|Broom Cupboard co-presented with Mark Goodier
29 June 1989 – Tim Smith was an uncredited co-presenter with Anthea Turner
27 July 1989 – Simon Parkin co-presented with Mark Goodier
28 December 1989 – Paul Gambaccini was guest presenter of a special end-of-decade show with Mike Read

The 1991 Gulf War caused the episode due to be transmitted on 17 January 1991 to be rescheduled for Saturday 19 January.

1991–1994 revamp: The break away from Radio 1 and Television Centre
When production moved to the BBC Elstree Centre in Hertfordshire, a new team of young presenters were introduced in place of the aging Radio 1 DJs. Tony Dortie and Claudia Simon had been working for Children's BBC, with Dortie having presented Saturday morning magazine UP2U (with former TOTP presenters Jenny Powell and Anthea Turner) in the summers of 1988 and 1989 and Simon being one of the presenters of BFT in 1990. Elayne Smith was an underground club DJ and compere who started hosting Channel 4 late-night variety show The 291 Club just a few weeks before the revamp. Smith left after just two episodes to concentrate on The 291 Club and was replaced in March 1992 by Femi Oke who was working at BBC Radio 5, whilst 17-year-old Mark Franklin was picked from local radio station BBC Radio Wiltshire. With a new theme tune and set of titles modelled on a weathervane, the first show was presented by Mark Franklin and Tony Dortie on 3 October 1991 with the first live performance Erasure's "Love to Hate You".

The first show of the revamp attracted 8.93m viewers, over 1m up on the show's average. Performance rules were altered so that acts had to sing live whether they wanted to or not and performances reflected the current album charts and American Billboard Hot 100 as well as the UK Singles Chart. Two presenters from the team always hosted each episode until July 1992 when Tony Dortie and Mark Franklin began to host some shows individually. By October 1992, the rest of the team had been dropped completely.

Mark Franklin (1991–1994)
Tony Dortie (1991–1994)
Elayne Smith (7 November and 5 December 1991)
Claudia Simon (1991–1992)
Adrian Woolfe(1991–1992) credited on-screen as Adrian Rose
Steve Anderson (1991–1992)
Femi Oke (1992)

Special appearances:
2 April 1992 – Harry Enfield and Paul Whitehouse were guest presenters under the alias of Smashie and Nicey
18 June 1992 – Bob Geldof guested as a co-presenter with Mark Franklin
17 December 1992 – Mr Blobby guested as a co-presenter with Tony Dortie
25 December 1992 – Sid Owen and Danniella Westbrook of EastEnders made guest appearances with Tony Dortie and Mark Franklin
25 December 1993 – Patsy Palmer of EastEnders made a guest appearance with Tony Dortie and Mark Franklin
4 January 1994 – Smashie and Nicey returned to present a special 30th birthday show
20 January 1994 – Joe Elliott of Def Leppard guested as a co-presenter with Tony Dortie

On Thursday 11 June 1992, BBC1 screened England's Euro 92 0–0 draw with Denmark so TOTP was moved to Saturday 13 June, broadcast at 5:30pm.

1994: Return of the Radio 1 DJs
The presentation changes introduced in 1991 did not have the impact producers had hoped for and by 1993 only Mark Franklin and Tony Dortie remained from the revamped team. Despite claiming 9m viewers in January 1992, the success of the revamp was short-lived and by May 1992 less than 6.5m were tuning in – a figure which remained fairly constant for the next eighteen months. Reasons for the sustained lack of popularity for the show ranged wildly from a general apathy towards the music that featured in the charts at this time to claims that the graphics styled around the 'weathervane' idea were hard to read.

Dortie and Franklin presented the show individually in rotation until January 1994 when Ric Blaxill replaced Stanley Appel as executive producer. Blaxill had produced shows for Radio 1 and had survived the first wave of change under new station controller Matthew Bannister which had seen many of the DJs deemed too old for the station to resign or be sacked. Of those DJs that survived Bannister's cull, Simon Mayo, Mark Goodier and Nicky Campbell had all presented TOTP prior to the 1991 revamp and were all reinstated as presenters from 3 February 1994. Also returning was Bruno Brookes, another stalwart of the pre-1991 presenting team, though he was fired from Radio 1 in a second wave of Bannister cullings in February 1995 and accordingly he left the Top of the Pops presenting roster in April.

Newer recruits to Radio 1, including Lisa I'Anson, Wendy Lloyd, Claire Sturgess and Jo Whiley, augmented the presenting line-up. Blaxill's ambition was to make the show seem like an event and he wanted the presentation between each song to be as spontaneous as the music it was introducing. To do this Blaxill introduced the 'golden microphone' and increasingly experimented with celebrity guest presenters, mainly drawn from the realms of comedy and sport, as well as pop stars who were not promoting a single that week, to introduce the show.

Simon Mayo (1994–1995, plus 30 August 1996)
Mark Goodier (1994–1995, plus 28 March 1996)
Bruno Brookes (1994–1995)
Nicky Campbell (1994–1997)
Jo Whiley (1995–1998, plus 23 April and 14 May 2006) (with Steve Lamacq 1995–1996)
Lisa I'Anson (1995–1996)

1994–1996: The golden mic – celebrity guest presenters
17 March 1994 – Robbie Williams and Mark Owen of Take That
7 April 1994  – Andi Peters
14 April 1994 – Meat Loaf
12 May 1994 – Jack Dee
19 May 1994 – Alice Cooper co-presented with Bruno Brookes
9 June 1994 – Vic Reeves and Bob Mortimer
16 June 1994 – Angus Deayton
7 July 1994 – Reg Presley of The Troggs co-presented with Mark Goodier
21 July 1994 – Julian Clary
25 August 1994 – Malcolm McLaren
1 September 1994 – Claire Sturgess
8 September 1994 – Brian Harvey and Tony Mortimer of East 17
29 September 1994 – Claire Sturgess
6 October 1994 – Steve Punt and Hugh Dennis
20 October 1994 – Jarvis Cocker of Pulp
3 November 1994 – Kylie Minogue
17 November 1994 – Michelle Gayle
1 December 1994 – Lily Savage
8 December 1994 – Neneh Cherry
15 December 1994 – Damon Albarn of Blur
22 December 1994 – Gary Glitter
25 December 1994 – Take That
5 January 1995 – Jack Dee
26 January 1995 – Eternal
2 February 1995 – Kylie Minogue
9 February 1995 – Gary Olsen
23 February 1995 – Peter Cunnah of D:Ream
2 March 1995 – Keith Allen
16 March 1995 – Lenny Henry
30 March 1995 – P.J. and Duncan
13 April 1995 – Phill Jupitus
27 April 1995 – Chris Evans
4 May 1995 – Whigfield
11 May 1995 – Simon Mayo
18 May 1995 – Lisa I'Anson
25 May 1995 – Stewart Lee and Richard Herring
1 June 1995 – Mark Goodier
8 June 1995 – Nicky Campbell
15 June 1995 – Michelle Gayle
22 June 1995 – Simon Mayo
29 June 1995 – Mark Goodier
6 July 1995 – Wendy Lloyd
13 July 1995 – Dale Winton
20 July 1995 – Gayle Tuesday
27 July 1995 – Craig McLachlan
3 August 1995 – Mark Goodier
10 August 1995 – Lisa I'Anson
17 August 1995 – Wendy Lloyd
24 August 1995 – Jarvis Cocker
31 August 1995 – Dale Winton
7 September 1995 – Jo Brand and Mark Lamarr
14 September 1995 – Robbie Williams
21 September 1995 – Simon Mayo
28 September 1995 – Jo Whiley and Steve Lamacq
5 October 1995 – Gareth Hale and Norman Pace
12 October 1995 – Nicky Campbell
19 October 1995 – Stewart Lee and Richard Herring
26 October 1995 – Simon Mayo
2 November 1995 – Suggs
9 November 1995 – Lee Evans
16 November 1995 – Louise
23 November 1995 – Nicky Campbell
30 November 1995 – Jack Dee
7 December 1995 – Gary Glitter
14 December 1995 – John Peel
21 December 1995 – Ronan Keating and Stephen Gately of Boyzone
25 December 1995 – Jack Dee and Björk
4 January 1996 – Nicky Campbell
11 January 1996 – Lisa I'Anson
18 January 1996 – Alan Davies
25 January 1996 – Lulu
1 February 1996 – Lee Evans
8 February 1996 – Julian Cope
15 February 1996 – Justine Frischmann of Elastica
22 February 1996 – Lisa I'Anson
29 February 1996 – Nicky Campbell
7 March 1996 – Louise Wener of Sleeper
14 March 1996 – MN8
21 March 1996 – Jo Whiley and Steve Lamacq
28 March 1996 – Mark Goodier
4 April 1996 – Dale Winton
11 April 1996 – Andi Peters
18 April 1996 – Bear van Beers
25 April 1996 – Chris Eubank
2 May 1996 – Michelle Gayle
9 May 1996 – Bear van Beers
16 May 1996 – Ian Wright
23 May 1996 – Skin of Skunk Anansie
30 May 1996 – Jack Dee and Jeremy Hardy

On 13 June 1996, BBC1 showed coverage of Switzerland vs Netherlands from Euro '96. Top of the Pops was accordingly moved from the Thursday to Friday, originally as a temporary move to incorporate the BBC's expansive portfolio of sport (as well as Euro '96, the 1996 Summer Olympic Games were also broadcast on the channel that summer), though it soon became clear that the move was permanent and, apart from a couple of one-off occasions on 25 June 1998 and 9 August 2001, TOTP never again returned to its original Thursday night slot.

14 June 1996 – Mark Owen
21 June 1996 – Julia Carling
28 June 1996 – Gina G
5 July 1996 – Mark Morrison
12 July 1996 – Bear van Beers
19 July 1996 – Keith Allen as 'Keithski'
2 August 1996 – Jas Mann of Babylon Zoo
9 August 1996 – Peter Andre
23 August 1996 – Bear van Beers
6 September 1996 – Julia Carling
13 September 1996 – Dennis Pennis
20 September 1996 – Tony Mortimer
27 September 1996 – Harry Hill
4 October 1996 – Tony Wright of Terrorvision
11 October 1996 – Bear van Beers
18 October 1996 – Nigel Kennedy
1 November 1996 – Julian Clary
8 November 1996 – Frankie Dettori
15 November 1996 – Charlie Higson, John Thomson, Paul Whitehouse and Mark Williams of The Fast Show
29 November 1996 – Ronan Keating and Stephen Gately
6 December 1996 – Gary Glitter
13 December 1996 – Ian Broudie of The Lightning Seeds
20 December 1996 – Shaun Ryder of Black Grape
25 December 1996 – Spice Girls, whose three performances were introduced by Robbie Williams, Mark Morrison and Gina G

1994: Top of the Pops 2 and the magazine
As the show entered its fourth decade, Blaxill exploited the strength of the TOTP brand by introducing a tie-in publication Top of the Pops magazine, first published in January 1995, and by launching a sister show, Top of the Pops 2, to augment the weekly music programme. Originally featuring the best of the main show's studio performances from that week with tips for future hits, the 45-minute-long TOTP2 showcased for the first time the extensive performance archive initially through spotlights on particular artists and a rewind to a given year in music each week. Debuting on 17 September 1994 in a 5.15pm Saturday afternoon slot on BBC Two, Johnnie Walker provided voice-over introductions before the show began to draw solely on archive performances from 1997, when former TOTP host Steve Wright took over. TOTP2 moved to a midweek early-evening slot in 1998, retaining a Saturday afternoon repeat, and regularly became one of the most watched shows on the BBC's second channel. Following a revamp of BBC Two's early peak schedules in 2002, the 45-minute show was given over to two shows of twenty-five minutes, and shows began to select celebrity guest editors, such as Jack Dee, Phill Jupitus and Vic Reeves, to choose their own favourite performances from the archive. After being 'rested' in 2004, a reformatted show featuring two new studio performances per week returned for a final full series in 2006–7, to replace the axed main show. Mark Radcliffe replaced Wright as presenter in 2009.

Johnnie Walker (1994–1997)
Steve Wright (1997–2004, 2006–2007, 2008, 2009)
Mark Radcliffe (2009–2017)

1997–2000: Into the new millennium
Ric Blaxill left in 1997, and the show was temporarily looked after by Mark Wells who continued his predecessor's policy of having rotating guest presenters. By this time, only Jo Whiley remained of the Radio 1 DJs introduced to the show by Blaxill, though Wells added Radio 1 Breakfast Show caretakers Mark Radcliffe and Marc Riley to the roster (although both Whiley and Radcliffe & Riley only appeared twice each between Blaxill's exit and the arrival of his permanent successor in June). With a background in 'serious' music broadcasting having worked on Channel 4's The Tube and The White Room, the new executive producer was Chris Cowey who stripped the show of the gimmicks bequeathed by its predecessors, increased the number of studio performances per week whilst reducing the reliance on music videos, and gradually built a new team of regular presenters with backgrounds in music television and radio to replace the celebrity guests. Alongside Whiley, who graduated from occasional host to lead presenter in June 1997, came Jayne Middlemiss and Zoe Ball. Middlemiss had presented music strand The O-Zone for Children's BBC since 1995, whilst Ball was given a full-time role after guest presenting in March 1997, and ahead of her posting as the host of Radio 1's coveted breakfast show in October. Fellow Radio 1 DJ Mary Anne Hobbs and Never Mind the Buzzcocks host Mark Lamarr were added to the team but were quickly dropped, though Jamie Theakston, co-host with Middlemiss on The O-Zone, and Ball on Live & Kicking arrived in January 1998 after guest presenting the previous October. All would continue to present The O-Zone and Live & Kicking concurrently with TOTP. Ball and Whiley departed in summer 1998 to be replaced by former Smash Hits editor Kate Thornton who established herself with Middlemiss and Theakston as lead presenters by autumn 1998. A revamp in May 1998 which included a change of title sequence, logo and theme music also saw a shift in focus from the Top 40 to the Top 20, with the chart rundown, now voiced every week by Radio 1 Chart Show host and former TOTP presenter Mark Goodier, extended from the Top 10 to Top 20. Children's TV presenter and model Gail Porter and Radio 1 DJ Scott Mills augmented the line-up from March 1999, and though Mills left in August, Porter continued with Middlemiss and Theakston as lead presenters into the new millennium.

Jo Whiley (1995–1998, plus 23 April and 14 May 2006)
Jayne Middlemiss (1997–2001)
Zoe Ball (1997–1998, 19 October 2001)
Jamie Theakston (3 October 1997, 1998–2002, 2003)
Kate Thornton (1998–1999)
Gail Porter (1999–2001)
Scott Mills (1999)

1997: More celebrity guest presenters
17 January 1997 – Rhona Cameron
24 January 1997 – Phil Daniels
31 January 1997 – Noddy Holder
7 February 1997 – Ardal O'Hanlon
14 February 1997 – Peter Andre
21 February 1997 – Ant and Dec
28 February 1997 – Ian Wright
14 March 1997 – Ian Broudie
21 March 1997 – Kylie Minogue
28 March 1997 – Zoe Ball
4 April 1997 – Mark and Lard (Mark Radcliffe and Marc Riley)
11 April 1997 – Mark Owen
18 April 1997 – Louise
25 April 1997 – Dannii Minogue
2 May 1997 – Cathy Dennis
16 May 1997 – Dannii Minogue
23 May 1997 – Mark and Lard
30 May 1997 – The Spice Girls
1 August 1997 – Mary Anne Hobbs
8 August 1997 – Phill Jupitus
15 August 1997 – Denise van Outen
22 August 1997 – Sarah Cawood
12 September 1997 – Mark Lamarr
3 October 1997 – Jamie Theakston
10 October 1997 – Mark Lamarr
31 October 1997 – Mary Anne Hobbs
28 November 1997 – Mark Lamarr
13 November 1998 – Katy Hill
10 September 1999 - Ana Boulter & Steve Wilson co-presented with Gail Porter
17 September 1999 – Emma Ledden & Ana Boulter
TOTP toured the country between 26 August (a rare Thursday show, broadcast on BBC2) and 15 October 1999. These shows were broadcast from different cities' nightclubs, in order: The Revolution, Edinburgh; Event II, Brighton; Club Wow, Sheffield; L2, Liverpool; Ikon, Newcastle-upon-Tyne; Dome II, Birmingham Black Orchid (Nottingham) and Time & Icon, Swansea 
Former presenter Mark Goodier returned to voice the Top 20 countdown between 1997 and 2002. At the beginning of 2003, he was temporarily replaced by Scott Mills.  Wes Butters voiced the countdown from February to November 2003.

2000–2003: Developing the brand
Richard Blackwood became joint lead presenter in August 2000 and presented in rotation with Jayne Middlemiss, Jamie Theakston and Gail Porter. At the end of August 2001, Middlemiss left the presenting roster. Josie D'Arby, who had hosted an episode in October 2000, made a short-lived return in August 2001 but joined Gail Porter in exiting before the end of the year leaving Jamie Theakston as lead presenter until March 2002 when he was replaced by new recruits model Lisa Snowdon and former TOTP guest presenter Sarah Cawood. Liz Bonnin joined the team from Channel 4 breakfast show RI:SE in May and the majority of shows throughout 2002 were presented by these three presenters, with Theakston only returning for sporadic appearances, and again on a couple of occasions in 2003.

After the 2000th edition on 13 September 2002, the presenting team continued to rotate solely between Liz Bonnin, Lisa Snowdon, Sarah Cawood alongside the returning Richard Blackwood until the new year. Blackwood's final show came on Christmas Day 2002, but the three females continued to present through 2003 along with an increasing number of occasional presenters drawn mainly from breakfast television and Radio 1. Colin Murray and Edith Bowman joined their former RI:SE teammate Liz Bonnin in mid-2003 and, though both were used sparingly, Bowman would return as relief presenter in 2006. Konnie Huq also presented three shows concurrent with her role as Blue Peter presenter in 2003. More successful was Huq's former Blue Peter colleague and The Big Breakfast host Richard Bacon who joined the presenting roster in January 2003, graduating to lead presenter by September. Along with newcomers and former children's television hosts Margherita Taylor, Fearne Cotton and Reggie Yates, this quartet presented in rotating pairs until another revamp of TOTP took place in November 2003.

Jo Whiley (1997–1998)
Jayne Middlemiss (1997–2001)
Jamie Theakston (1997–2002, 2003)
Gail Porter (1999–2001, plus 2 May 2003)
Richard Blackwood (2000–2002)
Josie D'Arby (6 October 2000, 2001)
Sarah Cawood (2002–2003, plus 30 July 2006)
Lisa Snowdon (2002–2003)
Liz Bonnin (2002–2003)
Richard Bacon (2003, 2005–2006)
Colin Murray (2003)
Edith Bowman (2003, 2006)
Margherita Taylor (2003, plus 15 April 2005)
Konnie Huq (2003)
Fearne Cotton (2003, 2004–2020)
Reggie Yates (2003, 2004–2016)

Guest appearances:

14 April 2000 – Sara Cox & Ana Boulter
29 May 2000 – Chris Moyles co-presented a special Bank Holiday Monday edition from Sheffield Arena as part of BBC Music Live alongside Jamie Theakston
6 October 2000 – Josie D'Arby
24 December 2000 – CBBC presenter Adrian Dickson hosted the Tweenies special
25 December 2000 – Sara Cox co-hosted with Jamie Theakston and Richard Blackwood
9 August 2001 – Sophie Ellis-Bextor, a show which was moved to Thursday
19 October 2001 – Zoe Ball and Jimmy Savile returned to present a show heralding the return to BBC Television Centre after ten years of recording at Elstree, with Jamie Theakston and Dermot O'Leary
16 November 2001 – Vernon Kay and Ana Boulter
25 December 2001 – Sara Cox co-hosted with Jamie Theakston
8 February 2002 – Dermot O'Leary
19 April 2002 – Melanie B
7 March 2003 – Ben Elton
4 April 2003 – Tony Blackburn co-hosted with Sarah Cawood and Lisa Snowdon
2 May 2003 – Gail Porter, former presenter, returns to co-host with Richard Bacon
27 June 2003 – Jonathan Ross co-presented with Fearne Cotton
15 August 2003 – Jack Osbourne co-presented with Edith Bowman
7 November 2003 – Ronan Keating co-hosted with Fearne Cotton, almost eight years after last appearing as a mid-'90s guest presenter

2002–2006: Top of the Pops Saturday 
In September 2002, in an attempt to combat the increasing ratings success of ITV's rival chart show CD:UK, the Top of the Pops brand diversified and a children's TV spin-off was created to run alongside the main show. Top of the Pops Saturday began on 21 September 2002 as a segment to fill the final 45 minutes of the BBC One Saturday morning kids programme The Saturday Show, presented by Fearne Cotton, who would graduate to presenting the main show from 2003. For the first season, Cotton co-presented with Simon Grant. Cotton alone continued to present the show after The Saturday Show ended its second season in 2003, with TOTP Saturday gaining its own stand-alone slot on BBC One at 11.00am, immediately following The Saturday Shows replacement Dick and Dom in da Bungalow. Following the removal of Saturday morning children's television from BBC One to BBC Two in 2005, the show was renamed Top of the Pops: Reloaded from 17 September until its end in March 2006. For this final season, Cotton was joined by former Pop Idol contestants Sam and Mark and Radio 1 DJs JK and Joel as co-presenters. The final show was shown on 25 March 2006.

Fearne Cotton (all episodes 2002–2006, plus the main TOTP show: 2003, 2004–)
Simon Grant (2002–2003)
Sam Nixon (2005–2006)
Mark Rhodes (2005–2006)
Jason King (2005–2006)
Joel Ross (2005–2006)

2003: All New Top of the Pops revamp
In 2003, former Top of the Pops presenter Andi Peters became new executive producer and began another radical overhaul. The first edition of All New Top of the Pops was broadcast on 28 November 2003, presented live by former MTV video jockey Tim Kash. The ratings for the first show were 5.65m. Kash presented shows alone until 30 April 2004, after which he began to present with previous presenters Fearne Cotton and/or Reggie Yates, who eventually began to present shows together without Kash. After presenting 14 February 2003 episode, Cotton became a more prominent presenter from June 2003, with Yates also joining the presenting roster in August. Both continued to present regularly until the November 2003 revamp. Kash left to rejoin MTV, making his last appearance in August 2004, allowing Cotton and Yates to present alone. For three shows in October and November 2004, Radio 1 Breakfast Show host Chris Moyles was drafted in to co-host alongside Cotton and Yates, and this trio also fronted the last show of 2004 before Christmas in a show styled as a Radio 1 Christmas party.

In 2003, Tim Kash became only the third presenter, after Jimmy Savile in 1971 and Noel Edmonds in 1978, to host Christmas Top of the Pops solo.

Tim Kash (2003–2004)
Fearne Cotton (2004–2020)
Reggie Yates (2004–2016)
Chris Moyles (2004, plus 29 May 2000, 22 April 2005 and 14 May 2006)

Only two shows between April 2004 and March 2006 did not feature either Fearne Cotton or Reggie Yates:
6 February 2004 – Natalie Brown covered Kash when he was absent.
15 April 2005 – Richard Bacon and Margherita Taylor returned as relief presenters to host, eighteen months after their last show together.
22 April 2005 – Chris Moyles and his Radio 1 breakfast show colleagues, Aled Haydn Jones, Rachel Jones and Dave Vitty were guest presenters.

2005–2006: The move to BBC Two and the end – return of guest presenters
In November 2004, it was announced that Top of the Pops would move from its primetime slot on Friday nights on BBC One to a new Sunday night slot on BBC Two, a move largely viewed as the last sidelining of the show before inevitable cancellation. The move was initially intended to take place in Spring 2005 and an 'extended format' was promised but the show remained on BBC One until July 2005 with the final Friday show on 8 July followed by another episode the following Monday. The first BBC Two show ran for 35 minutes, five minutes longer than the BBC One show, and aired live on Sunday 17 July 2005 at 7pm, immediately after the announcement of the new week's chart and incorporated elements of TOTP2, which had been rested a year previously, by showing two archive performances alongside the new music. However, viewing figures halved within a fortnight of the new scheduling, from an average of 2.4 million viewers on BBC One to around 1.5 million on BBC Two. The ratings never improved, despite the show going on location to the 2006 Winter Olympics and Radio 1's One Big Weekend, and on 20 June 2006 the BBC announced that Top of the Pops was being axed due to no longer being able to compete with 24-hour cable music channels, with the final episode airing on 30 July 2006.

New executive producer Mark Cooper oversaw a return to the use of guest presenters, a full list of which is given below, but unlike in the '90s, this time the celebrities were paired with one of the already established lead presenting team of Fearne Cotton, Reggie Yates, and newcomer comedian Rufus Hound. The three lead presenters appeared on all of the BBC Two shows between them and when not joined by a celebrity co-host they presented in pairs with each other or with one of the secondary presenting team of Richard Bacon and, from January 2006, Edith Bowman. Occasionally, the show was moved from Sunday nights but remained a live broadcast, as was the case on the following Mondays: 15 August 2005, 16 January 2006 and the five shows between 13 February and 13 March 2006. The show was also once transmitted on a Tuesday: 11 July 2006.

In May 2006, BBC staff were asked to form the audience for several Top of the Pops shows after it emerged that the BBC did not have a premises licence for hosting public entertainment events at Television Centre.

Lead presenters:
 Fearne Cotton (2004–2020)
 Reggie Yates (2004–2016)
 Rufus Hound (2005–2006)

Relief presenters:
 Richard Bacon (2005–2006)
 Edith Bowman (2006)

Guest presenters:
 17 July 2005 – Phill Jupitus
 24 July 2005 – Jeremy Clarkson
 31 July 2005 – Christian O'Connell
 15 August 2005 – Phil Tufnell
 28 August 2005 – Lulu
 4 September 2005 – Phill Jupitus
 11 September 2005 – Suggs
 2 October 2005 – Jeremy Bowen
 9 October 2005 – Richard Hammond
 16 October 2005 – Phill Jupitus
 6 November 2005 – Anastacia
 13 November 2005 – Sharon Osbourne
 27 November 2005 – Noddy Holder
 18 December 2005 – Justin Lee Collins (1.89m viewers)
 25 December 2005 – Shane Richie
 16 January 2006 – Peter Kay as Brian Potter from Phoenix Nights
 29 January 2006 – James May
 13 February 2006 – Sue Barker and Colin Jackson, from the 2006 Winter Olympics in Turin
 27 February 2006 – Jocelyn Brown and Matt Allwright
 13 March 2006 – Cyndi Lauper
 19 March 2006 – Trevor Nelson
 26 March 2006 – Jo Brand
 2 April 2006 – Trevor Nelson
 23 April 2006 – Jo Whiley
 7 May 2006 – Trevor Nelson
 14 May 2006 – Vernon Kay, Chris Moyles and Jo Whiley, as part of Radio 1's One Big Weekend in Dundee
 21 May 2006 – Diarmuid Gavin
 28 May 2006 – Preston of The Ordinary Boys
 4 June 2006 – Spoony
 18 June 2006 – Annie Mac
 11 July 2006 – Annie Mac – from T in the Park
 30 July 2006 – Jimmy Savile, Tony Blackburn, Dave Lee Travis, Mike Read, Pat Sharp, Janice Long, Sarah Cawood, Edith Bowman, Reggie Yates, Rufus Hound – an assortment of presenters past and present return for the last weekly show . Fearne Cotton, who was unavailable, also presented a brief pre-recorded segment from Fiji (3.98m viewers)

2006–2022: After the end: Occasional events-led returns

Top of the Pops 2
After being taken off the air in 2004, sister show Top of the Pops 2 was resurrected for a new run on Saturday nights at 8pm which reverted to the old format of mixing archive clips with new studio performances. The new series began two months after the original show ended, on Saturday 30 September 2006, with new studio performances provided by Nelly Furtado and Razorlight and a Top 10 chart rundown. All the episodes in this series followed the familiar TOTP2 presentation of no on-screen presentation, but rather a voiceover from Steve Wright:

30 September 2006 – Steve Wright (voice only); Razorlight: America and Nelly Furtado: Promiscuous
7 October 2006 – Steve Wright (voice only); Richard Hawley: Just Like The Rain and Jamelia: Something About You
14 October 2006 – Steve Wright (voice only); Nerina Pallot: Sophia and Seth Lakeman: The White Hare
21 October 2006 – Steve Wright (voice only); Amy Winehouse: Rehab
28 October 2006 – Steve Wright (voice only); Vincent Vincent and the Villains: Johnny Two Bands
4 November 2006 – Steve Wright (voice only); All Saints: Rock Steady and Gnarls Barkley: Who Cares
11 November 2006 – Steve Wright (voice only); Emma Bunton: Downtown and Ray Lamontagne: How Come
18 November 2006 – Steve Wright (voice only); Sandi Thom: Lonely Girl and Tony Bennett: Lullaby of Broadway
25 November 2006 – Steve Wright (voice only); Damien Rice: 9 Crimes
2 December 2006 – Steve Wright (voice only); The Fratellis: Whistle for the Choir
9 December 2006 – Steve Wright (voice only); Lil Chris: Gettin' Enough and Lily Allen: Littlest Things
16 December 2006 – Steve Wright (voice only); Kasabian: Empire
6 January 2007 – Steve Wright (voice only); Muse: Starlight
13 January 2007 – Steve Wright (voice only); Just Jack: Starz in their Eyes
20 January 2007 – Steve Wright (voice only); Regina Spektor: Fidelity
3 February 2007 – Steve Wright (voice only); Simon Webbe: My Soul Pleads For You, Duke Special: Freewheel and Kaiser Chiefs: Ruby
10 February 2007 – Steve Wright (voice only); The Feeling: Rose, Louise Setara: Wrong Again and Findlay Brown: Come Here
17 February 2007 – Steve Wright (voice only); Jack Savoretti: Dreamers and James Hunter: No Smoke Without Fire
24 February 2007 – Steve Wright (voice only); The View: Same Jeans and Corinne Bailey Rae: I'd Like To
3 March 2007 – Steve Wright (voice only); Madness: Sorry
10 March 2007 – Steve Wright (voice only); Westlife: Total Eclipse of The Heart and Maximo Park: Our Velocity
17 March 2007 – Steve Wright (voice only); Good Charlotte: The River, Lemar: Tick Tock and Muse: Invincible
24 March 2007 – Steve Wright (voice only); Kaiser Chiefs: The Angry Mob

Following the 2006–7 run, TOTP2 returned only to mark one-off special occasions and dropped the new performances. Such shows were dedicated to certain musicians such as Wham! and Duran Duran in 2010, as well as the death of Michael Jackson in 2009, or marked special occasions such as Christmas and New Year in 2008 and 2009, or tie-ins with a particular season of BBC programmes such as the School season which featured a back-to-school special to mark the end of the 2010 summer holidays, and an '80s-themed show to mark the final series of BBC TV drama Ashes to Ashes, also in 2010.

Continued TOTP
As well as the intermittent broadcasts of TOTP2 on BBC Two and a yearly Christmas Day show which remained on BBC One until 2022, Top of the Pops is survived by occasional 'event-led' broadcasts. It has twice returned for special shows for the BBC's biennial Comic Relief charity fundraiser in 2007 and 2009, with the following presenters:

16 March 2007 – Jeremy Clarkson, Richard Hammond and James May – Top Gear of the Pops for Comic Relief 2007
13 March 2009 – Fearne Cotton, Reggie Yates, Noel Fielding, French and Saunders, Davina McCall, Jonathan Ross, David Tennant and Claudia Winkleman – Comic Relief does Top of the Pops

From 2006 to 2021, an annual BBC One show which looks back at the previous year in music also appears each Christmas Day originally broadcast at 2pm but in later years at around 12pm. In 2009 and from 2012 to 2021, a second festive episode has followed on or around New Year's Eve with a New Year's Eve party theme: 

25 December 2006 – Fearne Cotton, Reggie Yates and Edith Bowman
25 December 2007 – Fearne Cotton and Reggie Yates
25 December 2008 – Fearne Cotton and Reggie Yates
31 December 2008 – Fearne Cotton and Reggie Yates
25 December 2009 – Fearne Cotton and Reggie Yates
31 December 2009 – Fearne Cotton and Reggie Yates
25 December 2010 – Fearne Cotton and Reggie Yates
25 December 2011 – Fearne Cotton and Reggie Yates
25 December 2012 – Fearne Cotton and Reggie Yates
31 December 2012 – Fearne Cotton and Reggie Yates
25 December 2013 – Fearne Cotton and Reggie Yates
31 December 2013 – Fearne Cotton and Reggie Yates
25 December 2014 – Fearne Cotton and Reggie Yates
31 December 2014 – Fearne Cotton and Reggie Yates
25 December 2015 – Fearne Cotton and Reggie Yates
1 January 2016 – Fearne Cotton and Reggie Yates
25 December 2016 – Fearne Cotton and Reggie Yates
31 December 2016 – Fearne Cotton and Reggie Yates
25 December 2017 – Fearne Cotton and Clara Amfo
31 December 2017 – Fearne Cotton and Clara Amfo
25 December 2018 – Fearne Cotton and Clara Amfo
28 December 2018 – Fearne Cotton and Clara Amfo
25 December 2019 – Fearne Cotton and Clara Amfo
30 December 2019 – Fearne Cotton and Clara Amfo
25 December 2020 – Fearne Cotton and Clara Amfo
31 December 2020 – Fearne Cotton and Clara Amfo
25 December 2021 – Clara Amfo and Jordan North
31 December 2021 – Clara Amfo and Jordan North

The festival specials did not return in 2022, and were replaced by an end-of-year review show on BBC Two:
24 December 2022 – Clara Amfo and Jack Saunders

The BBC has faced repeated calls for the return of the weekly chart show, but has insisted that this will never happen. In August 2010, however, the BBC disclosed that it was in talks with independent production companies with a view to developing a new weekly music show for BBC Three to begin sometime in 2011, although no such show was ever broadcast. In 2017 the BBC launched Sounds Like Friday Night, a new live music show hosted by Greg James and Dotty; it lasted just two series.

References

Top of the Pops
Presenters
Top of the Pops